Loch Laidon or Loch Lydoch or Loch Luydan is a long thin  freshwater loch, on a southwest to northeast orientation, with outlets on the southwest side, that form the loch into a walkingstick with two supports, and is located on Rannoch Moor on the boundary of both Argyll and Bute and Perthshire in the Scottish West Highlands, within the Highland council area of Scotland.  The largest of the western arms is 1.5 miles in length.  A new species or sub-species of brown trout was discovered in Loch Laidon in late 2018

References

Laidon
Laidon
Tay catchment
Lochaber
Laidon
Laidon